
Gmina Bobowo is a rural gmina (administrative district) in Starogard County, Pomeranian Voivodeship, in northern Poland. Other villages located in the gmina are listed in the box below.

Neighbouring gminas
Gmina Bobowo is bordered by the gminas of Lubichowo, Morzeszczyn, Pelplin, Skórcz and Starogard Gdański.

References
Polish official population figures 2006

Bobowo
Starogard County